Dorsa Rubey is a wrinkle ridge system at  in Oceanus Procellarum on the Moon. It is 100 km long and was named after American geologist William Walden Rubey in 1976.

References

Rubey